The 2003 FIA GT Oschersleben 500 km was the eighth round the 2003 FIA GT Championship.  It took place at the Motorsport Arena Oschersleben, Germany, on 21 September 2003.

Official results
Class winners in bold.  Cars failing to complete 70% of winner's distance marked as Not Classified (NC).

† – #14 Lister Racing was disqualified following the race.  Officials deemed the car made avoidable contact with the #4 Force One Racing Festina entry during the race.

‡ – #2 Konrad Motorsport was disqualified following the race.  Officials deemed the car had made dangerous maneuvers while behind the safety car.

Statistics
 Pole position – #2 Konrad Motorsport – 1:23.869
 Fastest lap – #7 Graham Nash Motorsport – 1:26.361
 Average speed – 144.110 km/h

References

 
 
 

O
FIA GT